Russian settlement in the Philippines began when Russians from China who were escaping communist rule left the country and settled in the Philippines.

Migration history
At the height of the communist movement in China, about 6,000 Russians left the country to find a new life elsewhere. Commencing in January 1949, under the care of the World Council of Churches, and guided by the International Refugee Organization, the displaced Russians were settled on the island of Tubabao in central Philippines.

Tubabao is about four hours boat ride from the city of Guiuan in Eastern Samar and the displaced Russians from China landed on chartered flights at the former US Naval base there in 1945, and were then shipped by boat to Tubabao where they erected a wooden church and lived in a tent city.

The Russians brought with them their culture and religion as St. John of Shanghai and San Francisco, then an archbishop of the Eastern Orthodox Church set up two places of worship in the island, namely the Church of St. Seraphim and the Church of St. Michael the Archangel. For months, the sleepy village became the sanctuary of people escaping the restrictions of communism, until they could be admitted to countries such as the United States, Australia, and France.

Today there are about 40 Russian families living in Metro Manila.

See also
Philippines–Russia relations

References

European diaspora in the Philippines
Philippines–Russia relations
Philippines